Yvon of the Yukon is a Canadian-Chinese animated television series produced by Studio B Productions (now known as "WildBrain") and Corus Entertainment in association with Alliance Atlantis Communications. It was produced with the participation of the Canadian Television Fund and the Canadian Film or Video Production Tax Credit with the assistance of British Columbia Film and the Film Incentive BC grant from the province of British Columbia. Based in the fictional Canadian town of Upyermukluk, the show premiered on YTV during Fall 2000, and aired with the final episode on January 24, 2004.

Premise
Yvon of the Yukon is about a French explorer, Yvon Ducharme, who embarks on a voyage to North America on behalf of "King Louis" (Louis XIV of France). He goes far off his intended course, into the frigid waters off Canada's northern coast, and is knocked overboard when his boat sinks an iceberg. Yvon is cryogenically frozen in a block of ice for 300 years, until a sled dog owned by Inuk teenager Tommy Tukyuk urinates on it and thaws him out. He settles in the town of Upyermukluk, Yukon ("the hottest cold town in the Arctic, midway between Shivermetimbers and Frostbottom Falls") and attempts to adjust his life in the Yukon along with his unusual new neighbours.

Cast
 Drew Reichelt – Yvon Ducharme
 Kirby Morrow – Tommy Tukyuk
Glen Gould – Bill Tukyuk
 Ian James Corlett – Willie Tidwell/King Louis
 Babz Chula – Luba Malloy
 Jane Mortifee – Big Mary Hatfield
 Phil Hayes – Additional Voices
 Garry Chalk – Mayor
 Lee Tockar – Additional Voices
 Brian Dobson – Additional Voices
 Colin Murdock – Additional Voices
 Kathleen Barr – Additional Voices
 Cathy Weseluck – Additional Voices
 Chris Roberts – Rusty Knobbs, Norad Geek
 Terry Klassen – Dil, The Duke
 David Kaye – Additional Voices

Honours
Yvon of the Yukon won the 2002 Leo Award for Best Youth or Children's Program or Series and Greg Sullivan was awarded the Best Director award for a Youth or Children's Program. The show captured both awards again in 2004. In 2005, Dennis Heaton won a Writers Guild of Canada Award for his work on the episode The Trouble With Mammoths.

Episodes

Season 1 (2000)

Season 2 (2001-2002)

Season 3 (2003-04)

References

External links

 Yvon of the Yukon – Telefilm Canada
 BBC – Yvon of the Yukon
 

2000s Canadian animated television series
2000 Canadian television series debuts
2004 Canadian television series endings
BBC children's television shows
Canadian children's animated comedy television series
Cultural depictions of Louis XIV
Fictional cryonically preserved characters
Stereotypes of Inuit people
Television series by Corus Entertainment
Television series by DHX Media
Television shows set in Yukon
YTV (Canadian TV channel) original programming
Television series about immigration in Canada
English-language television shows